L'esprit is the fourth album by In the Nursery, released in 1990 through Wax Trax! Records.

Reception

Mike Shea at Alternative Press remarked that with L'esprit the band successfully improved on the soundtrack-oriented approach of their previous album, Koda, and that "never before has music been able to move me to tears and rip up bad childhood memories."

Track listing

Personnel 
In the Nursery
Klive Humberstone – instruments
Nigel Humberstone – instruments
Q. – percussion
Dolores Marguerite C – narration
Production and additional personnel
Chris Bigg – design
Ruth Chappell – photography
Steve Harris – production
In the Nursery – production
Bill Stephenson – photography

References

External links 
 

1990 albums
In the Nursery albums
Wax Trax! Records albums
Third Mind Records albums